Elisabeth Maxwald (21 June 1967 -  9 July 2013) was an Austrian Paralympic skier. She represented Austria in Paralympic Alpine skiing at the 1988 Paralympic Winter Games in Innsbruck and 1998 Paralympic Winter Games in Nordic skiing in Nagano. She won four medals, two gold, a silver and a bronze.

Career 
She competed at the 1988 Winter Paralympic Games, winning a gold medal in the giant slalom in 4:18.47 (second Cara Dunne who finished the race in 4:59.62 and third Susana Herrera in 5: 30.41). She was disqualified in Women's downhill B1.

She competed at the 1998 Winter Paralympic Games in Nagano. She won gold in Nordic skiing, the 5 km classic technique race, ahead of the German athlete Verena Bentele and the Russian Lioubov Paninykh; she won silver in the 3x2.5 km bracket (together with Gabriele Berghofer and Renata Hoenisch); and she won bronze in the 5 km freestyle race.

References 

1967 births
2013 deaths
Paralympic alpine skiers of Austria
Paralympic cross-country skiers of Austria
Austrian female alpine skiers
Austrian female cross-country skiers
Alpine skiers at the 1988 Winter Paralympics
Cross-country skiers at the 1998 Winter Paralympics
Medalists at the 1988 Winter Paralympics
Medalists at the 1998 Winter Paralympics
Paralympic gold medalists for Austria
Paralympic silver medalists for Austria
Paralympic bronze medalists for Austria
20th-century Austrian women